Grímsstaðir is a settlement in north-east Iceland whose main claim to fame is that its weather station holds the low-temperature record for Iceland of -38°C: no doubt due to its sheltered location (at altitude of about 400 metres) between two upland areas (above 800 metres). One of its recent records was recorded on December 8, 2013, when the temperature fell at -24,2°C.

It is situated just off Route 1 (the main ring road around the island), where it crosses the large river Jökulsá á Fjöllum, about 37 km or 23 miles east of Lake Mývatn. The river was bridged in 1947: before that, traffic between north and east Iceland had to use a ferry. 

Currently the settlement has some accommodation for tourists, with discussions for growth. It also has an airstrip, in common with many isolated rural settlements in Iceland. It is a recognised stop on the bus route between Akureyri and Egilsstaðir (up to one bus per day in summer) although it is only during summer that the buses venture off the main road to the settlement itself.

Grímsstaðir features a tundra climate (Köppen climate classification: ET), bordering on a subarctic climate (Köppen climate classification: Dfc).

References

Populated places in Northeastern Region (Iceland)